Summer Nationals is the fourth EP by the American punk rock band The Offspring, released digitally in 2014 to coincide with the Summer Nationals tour with Bad Religion, Pennywise, The Vandals, Stiff Little Fingers and Naked Raygun. The EP contains covers of Bad Religion and Pennywise songs, and was released on Time Bomb, making this The Offspring's first venture away from Columbia since 1994's Smash. It is also the first Offspring release that session drummer Josh Freese did not play on since 2000's Conspiracy of One.

Track listing

Personnel
 Dexter Holland – lead vocals, rhythm guitar
 Noodles – lead guitar, backing vocals
 Greg K. – bass guitar, backing vocals
 Pete Parada – drums

References

The Offspring EPs
2014 EPs
Albums produced by Bob Rock
Covers EPs